Wojtkowiak is a Polish surname. Notable people with the surname include:

Grzegorz Wojtkowiak (born 1984), Polish footballer
Małgorzata Wojtkowiak (born 1982), Polish fencer
Stephen J. Wojtkowiak (1895–1945), American politician

Polish-language surnames